The Surfers Paradise Street Circuit is a temporary street circuit in Surfers Paradise, in Queensland, Australia. The  beach-side track has several fast sections and two chicanes, having been shortened from an original  length in 2010. It is the third of three motor racing circuits that have existed in the Gold Coast region, after the Southport Road Circuit (1954–1955) and Surfers Paradise International Raceway (1966–1987).

From 1991 to 2008, the circuit hosted an American Championship car racing event, the Gold Coast Indy 300. The circuit has also hosted touring car races since 1994, with the Supercars Championship currently contesting the annual Gold Coast 500 at the circuit.

Circuit

Background
Ron Dickson, the president of D3 Motorsport Development held the rights for CART internationally in the 1980s. Following lobbying from prominent Queensland businessmen, and a brief meeting with State Premier Joh Bjelke-Petersen, the event was confirmed for Queensland, and Surfers Paradise was chosen over Brisbane, the state capital. The original circuit layout was designed by Ron Dickson of D3 Motorsport Development, and was the fourth concept put forward for the Surfers Paradise area. Preliminary work was carried out in 1988, and the circuit was opened on 15 March 1991 for the 1991 Gold Coast IndyCar Grand Prix.

Construction
 
The construction of the circuit has been acclaimed internationally and is used as a benchmark for new temporary street circuits world-wide. Over a full 12-month period plans are laid and then implemented to transform a bustling residential, commercial and holiday destination into a temporary street circuit capable of facilitating high-speed motor races and hundreds of thousands of people. The circuit construction since 2009 has been project managed by local Gold Coast firm iEDM who specialise in motorsport venue engineering and delivery.

The circuit is also an international leader in motor racing safety standards applauded by the Confederation of Australian Motorsport and the FIA (the international governing body of motorsport). One of the major advancements over the later years of the Champ Car era was the installation of double height debris fencing, including an additional 610 panels in high impact areas in 2005.

Shortened layout
Since 2010, the Supercars Championship has run a notably shorter layout of the circuit. At the Turn 2 chicane, the circuit enters a hairpin to the left and rejoins the original track at the Esses. The then-CEO of V8 Supercars, Tony Cochrane, suggested this layout after the A1 Grand Prix cars dropped out of the 2009 event. This was an effort to reduce the cost of running the event without an international drawcard series. This was achieved by reducing the construction time, amount of materials needed and also limits the impact on local residents and tourists. It is no longer possible to use the full circuit with the G:link light rail line having been built over it.

History

American Championship car racing

An annual event had been held here beginning with the opening round of the 1991 IndyCar season. Following the merger of the Indy Racing League and Champ Car World Series in February 2008, the future of race had originally been secured until 2013 as an IRL IndyCar Series event, however the race was dropped from the calendar after the first demonstration race, and the A1 Grand Prix was signed up as a replacement, severing its eighteen-year history with American open wheel racing.

A1 Grand Prix
On 11 November 2008 after extensive negotiations with the IRL broke down, the Queensland Government reached a new five-year deal with A1 Grand Prix to stage a race at Surfers Paradise. The first A1GP race was supposed to take place on 25 October 2009. To accommodate the new link with the A1GP series and subsequent removal of the Indy name (which is a registered trademark of the Indianapolis Motor Speedway), the entire four-day event was called the Nikon SuperGP. However, on 17 October 2009, A1GP Chairman Tony Teixeira announced that the UK operating arm of the series went into liquidation in June. Access to the A1GP cars and the ability to pay its suppliers has been impeded. That caused the cars to be impounded the UK. A1 Grand Prix subsequently failed to arrive and were removed from the program, replaced with additional V8 Supercar races.

Touring cars

Since 2002, the Surfers Paradise race has counted for points in the V8 Supercars championship, now known as Supercars. V8 Supercars and the preceding Group 3A touring car category had previously appeared as a support category in 1994 and from 1996 onwards.

From 2003 to 2007, the touring cars officially shared top billing with the Champcar World Series, and then with the Indy Racing League in 2008. The 2009 race was amended after the demise of A1GP, moving to a  format of four  races, two on Saturday and two on Sunday. From that year on, Supercars are the major category at the event. For 2010 the format was changed to consist of a single  race on each day, with two drivers per car.

In 2011 Sébastien Bourdais became the first and only driver to win at Surfers Paradise in both a Champ Car (in 2005 and 2007) and a V8 Supercar (in 2011, and then again in 2012).

Lap records

As of 30 October 2022, the official race lap records at Surfers Paradise Street Circuit are listed as:

See also

 Sports on the Gold Coast, Queensland

Notes

References

External links
Official V8 Supercar Site 
Map and circuit history at RacingCircuits.info

Champ Car circuits
IndyCar Series tracks
Motorsport venues in Queensland
Supercars Championship circuits
Gold Coast Indy 300
Surfers Paradise, Queensland
Sports venues on the Gold Coast, Queensland
Roads on the Gold Coast, Queensland